Daniel Döringer (born 26 February 1991) is a German former professional footballer who played as a centre-back.

Career
Döringer played at VfB Unterliederbach before moving to SV Wehen Wiesbaden. He was the captain of the Wehen Wiesbaden youth team and won the A-Youth Bundesliga with the U19 team in 2010. In the 2011 summer, he signed a professional contract until 30 June 2012.

On 26 August 2014, Döringer joined 1.FC Saarbrücken in the Regionalliga Südwest. On 20 February 2015, he extended his contract until 2017.

References

External links

1991 births
Living people
German footballers
3. Liga players
Regionalliga players
SV Wehen Wiesbaden players
1. FC Saarbrücken players
Stuttgarter Kickers players
Association football defenders
Footballers from Frankfurt